The Old Dominion Athletic Conference (ODAC) is an NCAA Division III athletic conference. Of its 15 member schools, all but one are located in Virginia; the other full member is in North Carolina. The conference also has an associate member in North Carolina.

History

The conference was founded in May 1975 as the Virginia College Conference. On January 1, 1976, the name was changed to the Old Dominion Athletic Conference. The 1976–77 season was the first in which championships were offered. In 1980, Maryville College joined and became the first member outside of Virginia. In 1981, Catholic University joined the conference after leaving Division I's Colonial Athletic Association. In 1982–83, women's sports were added, and Hollins College (now university), Randolph–Macon Woman's College (now Randolph College), and Sweet Briar College all joined. Mary Baldwin College (now university) joined in 1984. In 1988, Maryville left and was replaced by Virginia Wesleyan College (now university). In 1989 Catholic left the conference to become a charter member of the Capital Athletic Conference, returning in 1999 as a football-only member. They were replaced by Guilford College two years later. The next school to leave the conference was Mary Baldwin, which left in 1992.

In 2010 the ODAC announced the addition of Shenandoah University as a full-time member, with its first full year of involvement during the 2012–13 academic year.

The league office moved its physical location from Salem, to Forest in eastern Bedford County located just outside centrally located Lynchburg, Virginia. They also contracted Jim Ward Design for its new marks.

On March 3, 2015, Sweet Briar College announced it was to close (cease operations) at the end of the 2015 summer session. However, on June 20, 2015, the Virginia Attorney General announced a mediation agreement that will keep Sweet Briar College open for the 2015–16 academic year. Sweet Briar reactivated its sports teams in the 2015–16 season and remained a full member of the ODAC.

On September 29, 2015, it was announced that Catholic University would withdraw in 2017 as associate member to join the new football league at the New England Women's and Men's Athletic Conference.

In June 2017, it was announced that Ferrum College would become the 15th full-time member of the Old Dominion Athletic Conference after it moved from the USA South Conference.

Southern Virginia University, which joined the ODAC as a football only member in 2019, announced in December of that year that it will be leaving both the ODAC and Coast to Coast Athletic Conference to join the football-sponsoring USA South Athletic Conference as a full member.

The conference has hosted Division III championships in football and men's basketball, both of which were held in Salem, Virginia. D-III softball has also used Salem as a championship host along with Division III women's lacrosse and volleyball on several occasions. Since 1993 - the conference and city have hosted over 80 Division III national championships.

It was announced on November 17, 2020, that Emory & Henry College will leave the ODAC and begin its transition to Division II in July 2021 and compete in the South Atlantic Conference in 2022.

The most recent change in conference membership was announced on March 8, 2021, that Averett University will leave the USA South and join its former USA South counterpart Ferrum College in the ODAC as a full member in 2022.

Chronological timeline
 1975 - The ODAC was founded as the Virginia Athletic Conference. Charter members included Bridgewater College, Eastern Mennonite College (now Eastern Mennonite University), Emory & Henry College, Hampden–Sydney College, Lynchburg College (now the University of Lynchburg), Randolph–Macon College, Roanoke College and Washington and Lee University. However, it was renamed to become the Old Dominion Athletic Conference on 1 January 1976, effective beginning the 1976-77 academic year, their first year of competition.
 1980 - Maryville College joined the ODAC, effective in the 1980-81 academic year.
 1981 - Catholic University joined the ODAC, effective in the 1981-82 academic year.
 1982 - Women's sports were instated in the ODAC, also three women's sports institutions of Hollins College (now Hollins University), Randolph–Macon Woman's College (now Randolph College) and Sweet Briar College joined the ODAC, effective in the 1982-83 academic year.
 1984 - Mary Baldwin College (now Mary Baldwin University) joined the ODAC, effective in the 1984-85 academic year.
 1988 - Maryville left the ODAC, effective after the 1987-88 academic year.
 1989 - Catholic (D.C.) left the ODAC, effective after the 1988-89 academic year.
 1989 - Virginia Wesleyan College (now Virginia Wesleyan University) joined the ODAC, effective in the 1989-90 academic year.
 1991 - Guilford College joined the ODAC, effective in the 1991-92 academic year.
 1992 - Mary Baldwin left the ODAC, effective after the 1991-92 academic year.
 1999 - Catholic (D.C.) re-joined the ODAC as an associate member for football, effective in the 1999 fall season (1999-2000 academic year).
 2012 - Shenandoah University joined the ODAC, effective in the 2012-13 academic year.
 2011 - Greensboro College and Notre Dame of Maryland University joined the ODAC as associate members for women's swimming, effective in the 2011-12 academic year.
 2015 - Ferrum College joined the ODAC as an associate member for men's and women's swimming, effective in the 2015-16 academic year.
 2016 - Notre Dame (Md.) left the ODAC as an associate member for women's swimming by discontinuing the sport, effective after the 2015-16 academic year.
 2017 - Catholic (D.C.) left the ODAC as an associate member for football, effective after the 2016 fall season (2016-17 academic year).
 2018 - Ferrum upgraded to join the ODAC for all sports, effective in the 2018-19 academic year.
 2019 - Southern Virginia University joined the ODAC as an associate member for football, effective in the 2019 fall season (2019-20 academic year).
 2021 - Southern Virginia left the ODAC as an associate member for football, effective after the 2020 fall season (2020-21 academic year).
 2021 - Emory & Henry left the ODAC to join the Division II ranks of the National Collegiate Athletic Association (NCAA) by becoming an NCAA D-II Independent in the 2021-22 academic year. They will join the South Atlantic Conference (SAC) in the 2022-23 academic year. Took effect following the 2020-21 academic year.
 2021 - Averett University announced that it will join the ODAC, effective in the 2022-23 academic year.
 2022 - Southern Virginia and Greensboro joined as associate members in men's wrestling in 2022–23 academic year.

Member schools

Current members
The ODAC currently has 15 full members; all are private schools:

Notes

Associate members
The ODAC currently has two associate members; both are private schools:

Former members
The ODAC has four former full members; all are private schools:

Notes

Former associate members
The ODAC had three former associate members; all are private schools:

Notes

Membership timeline
This timeline is expressed with color bars.

Purple denotes football playing member. 
Green denotes non-football playing member. 
Red denotes associate member (football-only). 
Blue denotes associate member (non-football).

Sports

The conference sponsors championships in the following sports:

References

External links